Shona Rachel McIntyrey (born 16 December 1980) is a former Scottish international cricketer whose career for the Scottish national side spanned from 2001 to 2004. She had played 4 women's one-day internationals.

McIntyre was born at Edinburgh.

References

External links

1980 births
Living people
Scotland women One Day International cricketers
Scottish women cricketers
Cricketers from Edinburgh